The ITU Radio Regulations (short: RR) is a basic document of the International Telecommunication Union (ITU) that regulates on law of nations scale radiocommunication services and the utilisation of radio frequencies. It is the supplementation to the ITU Constitution and Convention and in line with the ITU International Telecommunication Regulations (ITR). The ITU RR comprise and regulate the part of the allocated electromagnetic spectrum (also: radio frequency spectrum) from 9 kHz to 275 GHz.

Structure 
The current approved version of the ITU Radio Regulations (addition 2012) is structured as follows:

Volume 1 – Articles
 CHAPTER I – Terminology and technical characteristics
Section I – General terms (article 1.1-1.15)
Section II – Specific terms related to frequency management (article 1.16-1.18)
Section III – Radiocommunication services (article 1.19-1.60)
Section IV – Radio stations and systems (article 1.61-1.115)
Section V – Operational terms (article 1.116-1.136)
Section VI – Characteristics of Emissions and Radio Equipment (article 1.137-1.165)
Section VII – Frequency Sharing (article 1.166-1.176)
Section VIII – Technical terms relating to space (article 1.177-1.191)
 CHAPTER II – Frequencies
 CHAPTER III – Coordination, notification and recording of frequency assignments and Plan modifications
 CHAPTER IV – Interferences
 CHAPTER V – Administrative provisions
 CHAPTER VI – Provisions for services and stations
 CHAPTER VII – Distress and safety communications
 CHAPTER VIII – Aeronautical services
 CHAPTER IX – Maritime services
 CHAPTER X – Provisions for entry into force of the Radio Regulations

Volume 2 – Appendices
Volume 3 – Resolutions and Recommendations
Volume 4 – ITU-R Recommendations incorporated by reference
Maps to be used in relation to Appendix 27

Definitions
The Radio Regulations define:
 the allocation of different frequency bands to different radio services;
 the mandatory technical parameters to be observed by radio stations, especially transmitters;
 procedures for the coordination (ensuring technical compatibility) and notification (formal recording and protection in the Master International Frequency Register) of frequency assignments made to radio stations by national governments;
 other procedures and operational provisions.

Update
The drafting, revision and adoption of the Radio Regulations is the responsibility of the World Radiocommunication Conferences (WRCs) of the ITU, meetings of which are typically held every three or four years.

Recent WRCs are:
 Geneva, 1995 (WRC-95) 
 Geneva, 1997 (WRC-97)) 
 Istanbul, 2000 (WRC-2000) 
 Geneva, 2003 (WRC-03) 
 Geneva, 2007 (WRC-07) 
 Geneva, 2012 (WRC-12) 
 Geneva, 2015 (WRC-15) 
 Sharm el-Sheikh, 2019 (WRC-19) 

The most recent published version of the Radio Regulations, the "Edition of 2016" contains the complete texts of the Radio Regulations as adopted and revised by WRC-15, including all articles, appendices, resolutions, and a subset of the recommendations issued by ITU-R (previously known as the CCIR) (those "recommendations" which have a mandatory nature, as a result of being cited in the Radio Regulations).

The "Edition of 2020", adopted and reviewed by the WRC-19, is scheduled for publication in October 2020.

References

External links 
 Radio Regulations website
 World Radiocommunication Conferences website
 
 100 Years of ITU Radio Regulations (1906-2006)
 100 years of International Radio Regulations
 Contents of the Radio Regulations (including selected sections)
 ICT Regulation Toolkit by infoDev in cooperation with the International Telecommunication Union

International Telecommunication Union